The Solomon Islands Girl Guides Association is the national Guiding organisation in Solomon Islands.  Founded in 1949, the girls-only organisation became an associate member of the World Association of Girl Guides and Girl Scouts in 1987. It has 697 members (as of 2008).

From the 1990s to the year 2000, Guiding in Solomon Islands was inactive.

Sources

See also
 Solomon Islands Scout Association

External links
WAGGGS information on Solomon Islands

World Association of Girl Guides and Girl Scouts member organizations
Scouting and Guiding in the Solomon Islands
1949 establishments in the United Kingdom
Youth organizations established in 1949